AHDC1 is a gene, changes in which are found through clinical studies to cause an array of symptoms in affected children known collectively as Xia-Gibbs Syndrome, including global developmental delay, global hypotonia, obstructive sleep apnoea and seizures.

Clinical significance 
In 2014, a human genetic disorder (Xia-Gibbs Syndrome) caused by de novo mutations in AHDC1 was discovered through whole-exome sequencing. Four patients were identified in the paper which recorded the initial discovery and their clinical features were reported,  including global developmental delay, hypotonia, obstructive sleep apnea, intellectual disability and seizures. The publication of the paper and discovery of the new condition was reported in the media including in Science Daily and in Baylor College of Medicine News. Subsequent research has identified and reported the clinical features of an additional seven patients and there are now known to be twenty confirmed cases.

References 

Genes